Gylen Castle is a ruined castle, or tower house, at the south end of the island of Kerrera in Argyll and Bute, Scotland, on a promontory overlooking the Firth of Lorne. It was made a scheduled monument in 1931.

History

Built in 1582 by the Clan MacDougall. Gylen was only occupied for a relatively short time. The castle was besieged then burned by the Covenanters under General Leslie in 1647 during the Wars of the Three Kingdoms.

In May 2006 extensive conservation of the castle was completed with a £300,000 grant by Historic Scotland and £200,000 raised by worldwide members of Clan MacDougall.

References

External links

 

Castles in Argyll and Bute
Clan MacDougall
Scheduled Ancient Monuments in Argyll and Bute
Tower houses in Scotland
Kerrera